The San Francisco South of Market Leather History Alley consists of four works of art along the Ringold Street alley, at 8th Street, in San Francisco's SOMA district honoring leather culture; it opened in 2017.

Artworks
Collectively titled Leather Memoir, the artworks, mainly created by landscape architect Jeffrey Miller, are:
 A black granite stone etched with a narrative by Gayle Rubin, an image of the "Leather David" statue by Mike Caffee, and a reproduction of Chuck Arnett’s 1962 mural that was in the Tool Box (a gay leather bar),
 Engraved standing stones that honor community leather institutions including the Folsom Street Fair, 
 Leather pride flag pavement markings through which the stones emerge, and
 Bronze bootprints along the curb honoring 28 individuals who were an important part of local leather communities:
 Jim Kane (community leader and biker)
 Ron Johnson
 Steve McEachern (owner of the Catacombs, a gay and lesbian S/M fisting club that was the most famous fisting club in the world)
 Cynthia Slater (a founder of the Society of Janus)
 Tony Tavarossi (manager of the Why Not)
 Chuck Arnett
 Jack Haines (Fe-Be's and The Slot owner)
 Alexis Muir (an owner of South of Market bars and baths, including The Stud)
 Sam Steward
 Terry Thompson (SF Eagle manager)
 Philip M. Turner (founder of Daddy's Bar)
 Hank Diethelm (The Brig owner)
 Kerry Brown, Ken Ferguson, and David Delay (Ambush co-owners)
Alan Selby (founder of the store Mr. S Leather and known as the "Mayor of Folsom Street")
 Peter Hartman (owner of 544 Natoma art gallery and theater)
 Robert Opel
 Tony DeBlase (creator of the leather pride flag)
 Marcus Hernandez (Bay Area Reporter leather columnist)
 John Embry (founder and publisher of Drummer magazine)
 Geoff Mains (author of Urban Aboriginals)
 Mark Thompson (author and cofounder of Black Leather Wings)
 Thom Gunn
 Paul Mariah (poet, printer and activist)
 Robert Davolt (author and organizer of the San Francisco Pride leather contingent, and editor of Bound & Gagged)
 Jim Meko (printer and South of Market activist)
 Alexis Sorel (co-founder of The 15 and member of Black Leather Wings)
 Bert Herman (author and publisher, leader of handball community)
 T. Michael "Lurch" Sutton (biker and co-founder of the Bears of SF)

References

External list
 Ringold Alley Miller Company Landscape Architects
 Black Leather Wings

Leather subculture
LGBT art in the United States
Leather History Alley